International Coffee Day (1 October) is an occasion that is used to promote and celebrate coffee as a beverage, with events now occurring in places around the world. The first official date was 3 October 2015, as agreed by then International Coffee Organization and was launched in Milan. This day is also used to promote fair trade coffee and to raise awareness for the plight of the coffee growers. On this day, many businesses offer free or discounted cups of coffee.  Some businesses share coupons and special deals with their loyal followers via social networking.  Some greeting card companies sell International Coffee Day greeting cards as well as free e-cards.

History 
At a meeting on 3–7 March 2014, a decision was taken by the International Coffee Organization to launch the first official International Coffee Day in Milan as part of Expo 2015.

Various events have been held, called Coffee Day or National Coffee Day, with many of these on or around September 29.

The exact origin of International Coffee Day is unknown. In the United States "National Coffee Day" was mentioned publicly as early as 2005. The name "International Coffee Day" was first used by the Southern Food and Beverage Museum, which called a press conference on 3 October 2009 to celebrate it and to announce the first New Orleans Coffee Festival. It was promoted in China by the International Coffee Organization, first celebrated in 1997, and made into an annual celebration in early April 2001. Taiwan first celebrated International Coffee Day in 2009. Nepal first celebrated National Coffee Day on 17 November 2005. Indonesia, which first celebrated National Coffee Day on 17 August 2006, celebrates it on the same day as Indonesia's Independence Day.

National coffee days

See also
 List of food days

References

Further reading

External links 
International Coffee Day

Coffee culture
September observances
International observances
October observances
Observances about food and drink
January observances
April observances
May observances
June observances